Mambu may refer to:

 Mambu (company), a German fintech software company
 Helene Mambu (born 1948) Congolese public health expert, physician, pediatrician and United Nations diplomat
 Mambo (Vodou), a female high priest in the Vodou religion in Haiti

See also
 Mambo (disambiguation)